"Diva" is the winning song of the Eurovision Song Contest 1998, performed in Hebrew by Israeli singer Dana International representing . The music was composed by Svika Pick, with lyrics written by Yoav Ginai. The song was produced by Offer Nissim with music arrangements by Alon Levin and included on her fifth album, Free (1999). Dana International's win is considered one of the most groundbreaking moments in Eurovision history.

Eurovision selection and victory

The song became the last entry entirely in a language other than English to win the contest until 2007. As the song did not have any live orchestral accompaniment, the interval act was the last time live music from an orchestra was used in the contest, as the 1999 contest lacked the necessary budget and was held in a venue not large enough to hold one.

The selection of Dana International's song caused so much controversy amongst conservative groups in Israel that on her arrival in Britain, police escorts and security were required continuously. The performance consisted of Dana International wearing a silver dress, backed by four other female singers wearing black. It involved no dancing.

The song was the eighth entry performed on the night, following 's Sixteen with "To takie proste" and preceding 's Guildo Horn with "Guildo hat euch lieb!". At the close of voting, it had received 172 points, placing 1st in a field of 25. This was Israel's third Contest victory and, as they had not entered the previous year's Contest, they achieved the unusual distinction of having won a Contest the year after not competing.  also had this unusual bout of luck, having won in 2016 after missing the contest in Vienna a year before.

After the results were announced, Dana International caused a stir by arriving to the presentation late after a long delay, because she changed into an extravagant costume designed by Jean-Paul Gaultier adorned with bird feathers before performing the reprise.

It was succeeded as Israeli representative at the 1999 contest by Eden with "Yom Huledet (Happy Birthday)".

Congratulations
The song was chosen in an internet poll conducted by the European Broadcasting Union in 2005 as one of the 14 most popular songs in the history of the Eurovision, and was one of the entrants in the Congratulations 50th anniversary concert in Copenhagen, Denmark, held in October 2005. It was re-enacted by Dana International along with six dancers equipped with giant feathered fans and a live orchestra as the original footage was shown in the background. "Diva" came 13th in the final voting.

Digital release
Despite its legacy as a well remembered Eurovision winner, as of 2018, the song was unavailable on digital music platforms (with the sole exception of Scandinavia). Efforts were made to get the rights holders to release the song digitally; the efforts finally paid off, as on 11 April 2019 the English version of the song got released, with the Hebrew version to follow the week after.

Content
The song is a moderately uptempo number. It is an ode to powerful women of history and mythology: Victoria, the Roman goddess of victory or Queen Victoria, Aphrodite, the Greek goddess of beauty and love, and the Greek queen Cleopatra are named.

Track listings

 UK and Australian CD1
 "Diva" (English radio version) – 3:03
 "Diva" (Hebrew radio version) – 3:03
 "Diva" (Handbaggers remix) – 7:17
 "Diva" (G's Heavenly vocal) – 6:04
 "Diva" (G's Heavenly dub) – 7:28

 UK and Australian CD2
 "Diva" (English radio version) – 3:03
 "Diva" (Sleaze Sisters Paradise Revisited 7-inch) – 3:26
 "Diva" (Sleaze Sisters Paradise Revisited 12-inch) – 6:39
 "Diva" (Sleaze Sisters Euro Anthem) – 7:08
 "Diva" (Sleaze Sisters Paradise Revisited instrumental) – 6:39

 UK cassette single
 "Diva" (English radio version) – 3:03
 "Diva" (Hebrew radio version) – 3:03

 European CD single
 "Diva" (English version) – 3:01
 "Diva" (Hebrew version) – 3:01

 European remixes CD single
 "Diva" (original English version) – 3:01
 "Diva" (C & W Project mix) – 7:10
 "Diva" (Handbaggers remix) – 7:17
 "Diva" (Sleaze Sisters Paradise Revisited 12-inch) – 6:38

 French remixes 12-inch single
A1. "Diva" (Handbaggers remix) – 7:18
A2. "Diva" (C & W Project mix) – 7:10
B1. "Diva" (Sleaze Sisters Paradise Revisited) – 6:40
B2. "Diva" (original English 7-inch version) – 3:01

Charts

Weekly charts

Year-end charts

Certifications

References

Footnotes

Eurovision songs of Israel
Israeli songs
Eurovision songs of 1998
Hebrew-language songs
Congratulations Eurovision songs
Eurovision Song Contest winning songs
Dana International songs
CNR Music singles
LGBT-related songs
1998 songs